Elayaperumalnallur is a village in the Udayarpalayam taluk of Ariyalur district, Tamil Nadu, India.

Demographics 

As per the 2001 census, Elayaperumalnallur had a total population of 3072 with 1578 males and 1494 females.

References 

Villages in Ariyalur district